Morgan Hill can refer to several places in the United States:

Morgan Hill, California, a city in Santa Clara County
Morgan Hill station, a Caltrain station
Morgan Hill Unified School District
Morgan Hill Farm, historic home in Calvert County, Maryland
Morgan Hill (New York), mountain in Onondaga and Cortland counties, New York
Morgan Hill State Forest, in Onondaga and Cortland counties, New York
Morgan Hill, Pennsylvania, a census-designated place in Northampton County
Morgan Hill (Pennsylvania), a hill in Northampton County

See also
Morgan's Hill, Wiltshire, England